Pongaroa is a town in the Tararua District, in the southeast of the North Island of New Zealand, 110 kilometres southwest of Hastings and 200 kilometres northeast of Wellington. The nearest town is Pahiatua, 50 kilometres to the west. Popular Akitio Beach is 30 kilometres to the east. The township straddles Route 52, a road between Masterton and Waipukurau.

The New Zealand Ministry for Culture and Heritage gives a translation of "tall tree fern" for Pongaroa.

Pongaroa village has a population of about 100, with the surrounding farms bringing the total population to about 300. The area is serviced by Pongaroa School, Pongaroa Cafe and General Store, Pongaroa Hotel, and Pongaroa Farm Centre. Pongaroa is also the location of the New Zealand Centre for Equine Psychology and Behaviour and Wildside Farm environmental education retreat.

Local volunteers have been responsible for the public toilets, the establishment of a freedom campsite, and improvements to the village centre.

Historically, Pongaroa belonged in the northern Wairarapa area. At one time during the early settlement years in the latter half of the 19th century, the township was much larger: people expected that the Masterton-Napier Railway would run through Pongaroa. However, eventually the Wairarapa Line cut through Pahiatua (1897) and thus that township grew, whilst Pongaroa remained a farming community. Pongaroa became an administrative centre of Akitio County, which functioned between 1899 and 1976.

Pāpāuma marae, a marae (tribal meeting ground) of the Rangitāne tribes and its Ngāti Mutuahi, Ngāti Pakapaka and Te Hika a Pāpāuma hapū (sub-tribes), is located in the Pangaoroa area. It includes Te Aroha o Aohanga wharenui (meeting house), also known as Pāpāuma.

Demographics

The population of Pongaroa was 81 in the 2018 New Zealand census, a decrease of 6 (-6.9%) since the 2013 census, and a decrease of 36 (-30.8%) since the 2006 census. There were 45 males and 39 females, giving a sex ratio of 1.15 males per female. Ethnicities were 72 people  (88.9%) European/Pākehā and 30 (37.0%) Māori (totals add to more than 100% since people could identify with multiple ethnicities). Of the total population, 9 people  (11.1%) were under 15 years old, 9 (11.1%) were 15–29, 39 (48.1%) were 30–64, and 24 (29.6%) were over 65.

Owhanga

Owhanga, which also includes Weber, Wimbledon, New Zealand, Herbertville and Ākitio, had a population of 750 at the 2018 New Zealand census, an increase of 33 people (4.6%) since the 2013 census, and a decrease of 75 people (-9.1%) since the 2006 census. There were 285 households. There were 405 males and 345 females, giving a sex ratio of 1.17 males per female. The median age was 42.7 years (compared with 37.4 years nationally), with 180 people (24.0%) aged under 15 years, 93 (12.4%) aged 15 to 29, 357 (47.6%) aged 30 to 64, and 117 (15.6%) aged 65 or older.

Ethnicities were 90.8% European/Pākehā, 21.2% Māori, 0.8% Pacific peoples, 0.8% Asian, and 2.8% other ethnicities (totals add to more than 100% since people could identify with multiple ethnicities).

The proportion of people born overseas was 6.0%, compared with 27.1% nationally.

Although some people objected to giving their religion, 54.4% had no religion, 35.2% were Christian and 2.0% had other religions.

Of those at least 15 years old, 60 (10.5%) people had a bachelor or higher degree, and 144 (25.3%) people had no formal qualifications. The median income was $28,700, compared with $31,800 nationally. The employment status of those at least 15 was that 300 (52.6%) people were employed full-time, 117 (20.5%) were part-time, and 12 (2.1%) were unemployed.

Education

Notable people

 Maurice Wilkins (1916-2004), scientist

References

Populated places in Manawatū-Whanganui
Tararua District